Civil War: Young Avengers/Runaways (also called Civil War: Young Avengers & Runaways in the collected edition) is a comic book mini-series tie-in to Marvel Comics' Civil War crossover event. The series serves as a team-up between the characters from Young Avengers and Runaways. The series was written by Zeb Wells with art by Stefano Caselli. Young Avengers co-creator Allan Heinberg and Runaways co-creator Brian K. Vaughan served as creative consultants to Wells.

Production history
Civil War: Young Avengers/Runaways bridged the gap between the first and second volumes of the Young Avengers series, which went on hiatus due to writer Allan Heinberg's busy schedule with various television projects and his run on DC's Wonder Woman. It takes place after the events of Runaways v2 #21 and Young Avengers v1 #12, and before Civil War #3

Characters

Plot summary
The Runaways intervene in a fight between the Flag-Smasher and S.H.I.E.L.D. Cape-Killers, whose agents damage Victor. The Young Avengers see the altercation on television, and something about it causes the Vision to suffer a seizure. The Young Avengers steal a Quinjet and use Wiccan's magic to find the Runaways. Molly attacks the Young Avengers, thinking that they are working with S.H.I.E.L.D., but the team subdues her (when she becomes drowsy as a side-effect of her powers) and enters the Runaways' base to talk to them. The Vision and Victor experience seizures when they are near; the Vision explains that this is most likely ultimately due to their both having been created by Ultron.

Noh-Varr, a brainwashed Kree from an alternate reality, is sent by S.H.I.E.L.D to capture the teenagers. He attacks, breaking Xavin's neck and getting the Vision's phase-shifted lower arm stuck in his torso. Noh-Varr's handlers capture Wiccan, Hulkling, Karolina, and Xavin's body and take them to "The Cube", a high-security metahuman prison. The remaining members of both teams follow and attempt a rescue. The Cube's warden attempts to dissect Hulkling, but his organs shift to avoid damage. Xavin - who possesses similar shapeshifting powers to Hulkling - is able to right his broken neck and attacks the warden. Victor realizes that the Vision's arm, embedded in Noh-Varr's chest, has begun to interface with the alien. Victor overloads him by coming near, as he did with the Vision, and the Vision becomes able to remove Noh-varr's psychological conditioning. The two teams part ways and Noh-Varr takes control of the Cube, claiming it to be the capital of the new Kree empire.

Positions
Both the Young Avengers and the Runaways are opposed to the Superhuman Registration Act, but each team enters into the "Civil War" in a different way. The Young Avengers are based in New York City, the epicenter of the war, and they are acutely aware of the Act from the beginning. They are eventually captured by S.H.I.E.L.D., but they are rescued and recruited by Captain America and his "Secret Avengers". The Runaways are based in Los Angeles, which has few superhumans and is far from Captain America and his resistance, who are unable to make their presence felt in L.A. However, government-sponsored enforcers are deployed in L.A. to capture any West coast superhumans. The Runaways don't keep up with current events and maintain a position of indifference and laissez-faire until they are engaged by S.H.I.E.L.D. enforcers.

Collected editions
Civil War: Young Avengers & Runaways collects Civil War: Young Avengers/Runaways #1-4. This trade paperback also includes Official Handbook of the Marvel Universe biographies of some of the members of the Young Avengers and the Runaways.

The covers of the four issues of the miniseries can be placed side by side to create a large panoramic poster which is included in the collected edition on two separate pages.

References

2006 comics debuts
2006 comics endings
Crossover comics
Avengers (comics) titles